Chromacris is a genus of lubber grasshoppers in the family Romaleidae. The nine described species  in Chromacris  are found in Mexico, Central America, or South America.

Species
These nine species belong to the genus Chromacris:
 Chromacris colorata (Serville, 1838)
 Chromacris icterus (Pictet & Saussure, 1887)
 Chromacris miles (Drury, 1770)
 Chromacris minuta Roberts & Carbonell, 1982
 Chromacris nuptialis (Gerstaecker, 1873)
 Chromacris peruviana (Pictet & Saussure, 1887)
 Chromacris psittacus (Gerstaecker, 1873)
 Chromacris speciosa (Thunberg, 1824)
 Chromacris trogon (Gerstaecker, 1873)

References

Further reading

External links

 

Romaleidae